Drumond Park is an independent British game manufacturer. Since 2019, their products are distributed by Tomy.

Notable Brands

Current
 Absolute Balderdash
 All Star Family Fortunes
 Articulate
 Articulate Your Life!
 Articulate For Kids
 Bang On!
 Barbecue Party
 Catch Phrase
 Crazy Claw
 Dig In!
 Don't Laugh!
 Gassy the Cow
 Horrid Practical Jokes
 King Pong
 The Logo Board Game
 Logo Lite
 The Best of British
 His & Hers
 The Best of TV and Movies
 Logo What Am I?
 The Magic Tooth Fairy Game
 Og on the Bog
 Pendemonio
 Pickin' Chickens
 Rapidough
 Shark Bite
 Snotcha!
 Stoopido
 SSHH! Don't Wake Dad!
 Who's the Dude?
 Wordsearch!
 Wordsearch! Junior

Former
 Animatazz
Bubble Buster
Bubble Buster Kazoo
 Doh Nutters (Transferred over to John Adams Leisure in 2016)
 Pig Goes Pop (Transferred over to John Adams Leisure in 2016)
 Countdown
 Deal or No Deal
 Board Game
 Card Game
 Electronic Game
 Eggheads
 Million Pound Drop
 Gross Magic (Transferred over to John Adams Leisure in 2018)
 The Box of Shocks (Transferred over to John Adams Leisure in 2018)
 Oginov Tumbler
 Pumpalloons
 Rubik's (Transferred to John Adams Leisure in 2011)
 Rubik's Cube
 Rubik's Revenge
 Rubik's Homer Head
 Rubik's Cube Keychain
 Rubik's 360

References

Toy companies of the United Kingdom
Board game publishing companies